Abacoproeces saltuum is a species of spider belonging to the family Linyphiidae.

It is native to Europe to South Siberia.

References

Linyphiidae
Spiders described in 1872
Spiders of Asia
Spiders of Europe